The Waterford Steamship Company provided shipping services between Waterford and Bristol and Liverpool from 1836 to 1912.

History

The Waterford Steamship company ran 13 steamers to Bristol, Liverpool and Irish ports. Services had been operating prior to 1836, but in this year they was reorganised and it was registered as a new company.

In 1870 the services operated from Waterford to London were taken over by the British and Irish Steam Packet Company.

In 1901, in a heavy fog, RMS Oceanic of the White Star Line was involved in a collision when she rammed and sank the small Waterford Steamship Company ship SS Kincora, killing 7 people.

It was absorbed by the Clyde Shipping Company in 1912.

References

1836 establishments in Ireland
Transport companies disestablished in 1912
Transport companies established in 1836
Packet (sea transport)
Shipping companies of Ireland
Transport in Waterford (city)
1912 disestablishments in Ireland